Commelina eckloniana is an herbaceous plant in the dayflower family with a broad distribution in Central and East Africa. 

It ranges from Ethiopia, Kenya, and Tanzania in the east, west through Uganda, Burundi, Rwanda, and Malawi, into the Democratic Republic of the Congo and Zambia. It is considered one of the most diverse species in Africa. Its distinctive characteristics include a fused spathe with sparse hairs, blue flowers with bilocular ovaries, and nearly square fruits containing four seeds that are roughly spherical. It currently contains five subspecies, and at times has been split into five separate species that mostly correspond to the currently recognised subspecies. However, some of the subspecies may be functioning as species, and further study is needed to resolve the question of species limits in this group.

Subspecies
 Commelina eckloniana subsp. claessensii (De Wild.) Faden - Democratic Republic of the Congo, Uganda
 Commelina eckloniana subsp. critica (De Wild.) Faden - Democratic Republic of the Congo, Tanzania, Zambia, Malawi
 Commelina eckloniana subsp. echinosperma (K.Schum.) Faden - Democratic Republic of the Congo, Tanzania, Zambia, Rwanda, Burundi, Kenya, Uganda, Ethiopia
 Commelina eckloniana subsp. eckloniana - Zimbabwe, South Africa, Eswatini
 Commelina eckloniana subsp. nairobiensis (Faden) Faden - Kenya
 Commelina eckloniana subsp. thikaensis Faden - Kenya

References

eckloniana
Flora of Africa
Plants described in 1843